Torneio Mercosul (English: Mercosur Tournament, Spanish: Torneo Mercosur) was an international football competition played in 1995 in Santa Catarina state, Brazil.

The competition was considered at the time, by Santa Catarina press, as an embryo of Copa Mercosur. It was intended to have a second edition of Torneio Mercosul in 1996, but it never happened. The budget of the competition was US$ 400,000.00. CONMEBOL did not recognize this competition.

Invited teams

Barcelona, Estudiantes, Grêmio, Internacional, Juventude, Peñarol and Racing declined the invitation to play in the competition.

Organizers of the competition
The organizers of the competition were Centertur and Estratégia B.

Companies supporting Torneio Mercosul
Cecrisa, Construtora Caseca, Petrobras, and Sadia were the companies that supported the competition.

Format
The first round was played in four playoff matches. Marcílio Dias got a bye in this round. In the second round, Marcílio Dias played against one of the first round qualified teams for a semifinal spot. The next round was the semifinal round, followed by the final.

Results

First round

Intermediate round

Semifinals

Final

Statistics

Overview
The tournament was considered a failure. One of the reasons was that Centertur used a rubber check to pay the accommodations of Olimpia at Hotel Mariner Plaza in Itajaí. Also, many traditional teams declined to play the tournament, exhausting the competition before it started. The tournament was discontinued and three years later, the Copa Mercosur's first edition was played.

See also
Copa Mercosur

References

 Iª Copa Mercosul 1995

Copa Mercosur
1995 in Brazilian football
1995 in Uruguayan football
1995 in Ecuadorian football
1995 in Paraguayan football
1994–95 in Argentine football
1995 in South American football